Natasha Patricia "Tash" Hind (born 21 August 1989, Wellington) is a New Zealand representative swimmer. She won the silver medal in the 4 × 200 m freestyle relay at the 2010 Commonwealth Games alongside Lauren Boyle, Amaka Gessler and Penelope Marshall. She won the bronze medal with the same team in the 4 × 100 m freestyle relay at the same Games.

She has competed at two Olympics.  In 2008, she was part of the New Zealand women's  freestyle team, and in 2012 she was part of the women's  and  freestyle relay teams.  She also competed in both events at the 2014 Commonwealth Games.

See also
 List of Commonwealth Games medallists in swimming (women)

References

1989 births
Living people
New Zealand female swimmers
Olympic swimmers of New Zealand
Swimmers at the 2008 Summer Olympics
Swimmers at the 2012 Summer Olympics
Commonwealth Games silver medallists for New Zealand
Commonwealth Games bronze medallists for New Zealand
Swimmers at the 2010 Commonwealth Games
Commonwealth Games medallists in swimming
Universiade medalists in swimming
Swimmers from Wellington City
Swimmers at the 2014 Commonwealth Games
Universiade silver medalists for New Zealand
Medalists at the 2011 Summer Universiade
20th-century New Zealand women
21st-century New Zealand women
Medallists at the 2010 Commonwealth Games